Vilma Degischer (17 November 1911 - 3 May 1992) was an Austrian theatre and film actress. She appeared in more than thirty films from 1931 to 1991. From 1931 to 1991 she played at the Theater in der Josefstadt in Vienna.

Early life
After she attended school she had originally wanted to be a dancer, and had been taught by Gertrud Bodenwieser. Only then did she discover she had a talent for acting.

Filmography

References

External links
 

1911 births
1992 deaths
Actresses from Vienna
Austrian film actresses
Austrian stage actresses
20th-century Austrian actresses